Taskala (Tasqala), previously Kamenka, is a small town in north-western Kazakhstan on the border with Russia. It is the administrative center of Taskala District in West Kazakhstan Region. Population:

References

Populated places in West Kazakhstan Region